Hajjeh (also transliterated Hajje, Hajjeh, al-Hejjeh, al-Hijjeh, Alhaja, Hadja) is a village located at the Zahrani River in the Sidon District (Saida Caza) of the South Governorate in Lebanon, about 56 kilometers South of the national capital Beirut.

History 
In 1875 Victor Guérin found the village to be located on the southern part of a valley, and inhabited by 350  Maronites.

In June 2003, Chucrallah-Nabil El-Hage - who was born in Hajjeh in 1943 - was elected Archbishop of the Maronite Catholic Archeparchy of Tyre. In September of that year he was confirmed by the Holy See and his ordaination took place on 29 November 2003.

In the July 2006 Lebanon War between Israel and Hezbollah the town bridge was destroyed in bombardments by the Israeli Air Force (IAF).

In November 2020, the Synod of Bishops of the Maronite Catholic Patriarchate of Antioch announced that it accepted El-Hage's age-related resignation and that it had elected Charbel Abdallah as his successor. Abdallah was born in 1967 and hails from Hajjeh as well.

People from Hajjeh
Chucrallah-Nabil El-Hage (b. 1943)
Maroun Ammar (b. 1956)
Charbel Abdallah (b. 1967)

References

Bibliography
  

Populated places in Sidon District
Maronite Christian communities in Lebanon